Keskea rõõmud is a 1986 Estonian drama film directed by Lembit Ulfsak.

Awards, nominations, participations:
 1987: ETKVL filmiklubi debüütfilmide festival (Tallinn, USSR), 1987, Rainbow award - best director debut: Lembit Ulfsak; best cinematographer debut: Nikolai Šarubin
 1987: Estonian Film Days in Helsinki, participation
 1987: All-Union Film Festival (USSR), participation

Plot

Cast

 Tõnu Kark - Tõnu Loorits
 Maria Klenskaja - Pille Loorits
 Kaie Mihkelson - Helena
 Ülle Kaljuste - Silva Raud
 Lembit Ulfsak - Hubert Raud

References

External links
 
 Keskea rõõmud, entry in Estonian Film Database (EFIS)

1986 films
Estonian drama films
Estonian-language films